"All Goes Wrong" is a song by British record production duo Chase & Status, featuring vocals from Tom Grennan. The song was released as a digital download on 22 September 2016 through MTA Records and Mercury Records. The song peaked at number 65 on the UK Singles Chart. The song was written by Saul Milton, William Kennard, Kieron McIntosh, Nathaniel Ledwidge, Tom Grennan, Dean McIntosh and produced by Chase & Status.

Music video
A music video to accompany the release of "All Goes Wrong" was first released onto YouTube on 12 July 2016 at a total length of three minutes and thirty-two seconds.

Use in other media
The song was used by Sky Sports F1 in their 2016 Formula One season highlights video. On 12 July 2017, he performed the song at the Formula One live event in London. The song was used in the US TV show Power. The song is also used in the opening title sequence for the Sky One police action drama Bulletproof. The song was also used in the ending sequence of the PSVR title "Blood & Truth".

Track listing

Charts

Release history

References

2016 singles
2016 songs
Chase & Status songs
Songs written by Saul Milton
Songs written by Will Kennard
Mercury Records singles
Song recordings produced by Chase & Status
Television drama theme songs